The NECVA Championship Tournament was the culminating event of the season for the North East Collegiate Volleyball Association, an NCAA Division III conference that only sponsored men's volleyball. The tournament was held annually in April, and its location was selected by the NECVA Executive Board from a pool of hosting bids. By the time of its final edition in 2011, the tournament featured 16 of the conference's 43 member schools—the top two in each of five divisions (CUNYAC, GNAC, Metro, New England, and Western), plus six at-large selections. The NECVA champion tournament received one of four automatic bids to the Molten Division III Final Four later in April.

The NECVA chose to disband at the end of the 2011 season after the NCAA announced it would begin sponsoring an official Division III men's championship in 2012.

Necva Tournament Participation History
As Metro 1995-97; NECVA 1998 to 2011

∗ Denotes program discontinued

NECVA past champions

∗Note: Lehman College won the championship; title was later vacated;

Notes

External links
List of past champions on the official NECVA association web-page
List of past participators on the official NECVA association web-page

See also
North East Collegiate Volleyball Association
NCAA Men's National Collegiate Volleyball Championship
Molten Division III Men's Invitational Volleyball Championship Tournament, predecessor to the NCAA Division III tournament
NCAA Men's Division III Volleyball Championship, the creation of which led to the demise of both the NECVA and the Molten Invitational

College sports championships in the United States
Recurring sporting events established in 1995
Recurring events disestablished in 2011